Paul Yelle (born 22 February 1964) is a Barbadian swimmer. He competed in three events at the 1988 Summer Olympics.

References

1964 births
Living people
Barbadian male swimmers
Olympic swimmers of Barbados
Swimmers at the 1988 Summer Olympics
Place of birth missing (living people)